Guillermo Gonzalez, better known as Pedro "El Rockero" Alcázar (16 September 1975 in Zapayal, Panama – 24 June 2002) was a Panamanian boxer who won the WBO Super flyweight championship, and then sustained fatal injuries in the ring.

Background
A single parent of two, Alcazar first began boxing at the age of 10 and was the Panamanian Golden Gloves champion and a Gold Medalist in the Central American Games.

He was a protégé of the legendary Hall of Famer Roberto Durán, who was a pallbearer at his funeral.

Death
Alcazar's death shocked the boxing world. He lost his title to Fernando Montiel in Las Vegas, Nevada on 22 June 2002. Immediately following the bout, Alcazar was declared healthy by ringside doctors, with no visible signs of any trauma. He went sightseeing the day after the fight and was in his hotel room getting ready to fly back to Panama when he collapsed. He was taken to hospital, where he died.

This was the first time in boxing history that a boxer is known to have collapsed so long after the end of a fight. The boxing authorities have discussed compulsory medical testing for boxers up to 48 hours after a fight finishes, longer than heretofore. There was already concern following the Michael Watson case, which in the United Kingdom established the principle that the authorities have a wide responsibility for the health and safety of boxers (and also spectators). Alcazar's death highlighted the manner in which it can take an extended time before potentially life-threatening symptoms present themselves.

External links

1975 births
2002 deaths
Deaths due to injuries sustained in boxing
Flyweight boxers
Super-flyweight boxers
World boxing champions
World super-flyweight boxing champions
World Boxing Organization champions
Sports deaths in Nevada
Panamanian male boxers
Central American Games medalists in boxing
Central American Games gold medalists for Panama